Phillip Burgess (born 1 July 1988) is an English rugby sevens player who plays for the England national rugby sevens team on the World Rugby Sevens Series..

He competed at the 2016 Summer Olympics in Rio de Janeiro, where he won a silver medal in the men's tournament with the British team.

References

External links
 
 
 
 
 
 

1988 births
Living people
English rugby sevens players
Olympic rugby sevens players of Great Britain
Great Britain national rugby sevens team players
Rugby sevens players at the 2016 Summer Olympics
Olympic silver medallists for Great Britain
Olympic medalists in rugby sevens
Medalists at the 2016 Summer Olympics
Male rugby sevens players
Rugby sevens players at the 2014 Commonwealth Games
Commonwealth Games rugby sevens players of England
Commonwealth Games medallists in rugby sevens
Commonwealth Games bronze medallists for England
Medallists at the 2018 Commonwealth Games